Technopolis Oyj is a Finnish privately held company providing business incubator office space and services. Technopolis owns and operates 16 campuses located in the Nordic and Baltic region, often near universities or city centers. 45,000 people work and 1,500 companies operate in the business campuses. Originally from Oulu, Technopolis campuses are located also in Espoo, Helsinki, Vantaa, and Tampere in Finland, and in Oslo, Norway, Vilnius, Lithuania, Tallinn, Estonia, Luxembourg City, Luxembourg as well as in Gothenburg and Stockholm, Sweden.

In August 2018 Kildare Nordic Acquisitions S.à.r.l. (Kildare Partners) announced a public cash tender offer on all shares in Technopolis Plc. On 31 December 2018 Kildare held 97.4% of all shares.

Campuses

References

External links 
Technopolis global website
Technopolis Estonia website
Technopolis Finland website
Technopolis Lithuania website
Technopolis Luxembourg website
Technopolis Norway website
Technopolis Sweden website

Business incubators of Finland
Companies based in Oulu
Companies formerly listed on Nasdaq Helsinki